Micropolyphony is a kind of polyphonic musical texture developed by György Ligeti which consists of many lines of dense canons moving at different tempos or rhythms, thus resulting in tone clusters vertically. According to David Cope, "micropolyphony resembles cluster chords, but differs in its use of moving rather than static lines"; it is "a simultaneity of different lines, rhythms, and timbres".

Differences between micropolyphonic texture and conventional polyphonic texture can be explained by Ligeti's own description:

The earliest example of micropolyphony in Ligeti's work occurs in the second movement (mm 25–37) of his orchestral composition Apparitions. He used the technique in a number of his other works, including Atmosphères for orchestra; the first movement of his Requiem for soprano, mezzo-soprano, mixed choir, and orchestra; the unaccompanied choral work Lux aeterna; and Lontano for orchestra. Micropolyphony is easier with larger ensembles or polyphonic instruments such as the piano, though the Poème symphonique for a hundred metronomes creates "micropolyphony of unparallelled complexity". Many of Ligeti's piano pieces are examples of micropolyphony applied to complex "minimalist" Steve Reich and Pygmy music derived rhythmic schemes.

References

Sources

Further reading
 Drott, Eric (2011). "Lines, Masses, Micropolyphony: Ligeti's Kyrie and the 'Crisis of the Figure'". Perspectives of New Music 49, no. 1 (Winter):4–46.
  (2003). "Beszélgetések Ligeti Györgyyel", translated by Gabor J. Schabert. In Ligeti in Conversation with Péter Várnai, Josef Häusler, Claude Samuel, and Himself, pp. 13–82. Eulenberg Music Series. London: Eulenberg Books. .

Musical texture